Carnguwch is a former civil parish in the Welsh county of Gwynedd. It was abolished in 1934, and incorporated into Pistyll.

References

Pistyll